Macrostomus wiedemanni is a species of dance flies, in the fly family Empididae.

References

Macrostomus
Insects described in 1962
Diptera of South America